Mikhail Pavlovich Ovchinnikov (1844–1921) was a Russian revolutionary, political exile, and amateur archeologist active in the Irkutsk Governorate. Ovchinnikov discovered many ancient sites around Irkutsk that were later reexamined by Irkutsk State University academia. His passion for Eastern Siberian archeology led to contemporaries dubbing him "the Father of Siberian Archeology."

Early life
Ovchinnikov was born into the family of an Arkhangelsk Protopope and attended the local Theological Seminary. He studied at the Saint Petersburg Medical and Surgical Academy but eventually dropped out. Ovchinnikov enlisted in the Imperial Russian Army and served as a clerk until the spring of 1873. He then worked in a Saint Petersburg industrial factory but soon quit. Ovchinnikov began expounding the ideals of the revolutionary Narodnaya Volya in the Russian countryside. He visited villages and towns in the Kaluga, Moscow, Oryol, Tula, Tver Governorates among others to spread their political ideals.

Olyokminsk exile
Ovchinnikov was a defendant in the 1877 "Trial of 50" and was banished to Kansk in the Yeniseysk Governorate. In 1881 he escaped into European Russia and lived as a fugitive. Imperial authorities recaptured him in 1885 and punished him with five years in the Russian Arctic. While he was originally was sentenced to Verkhoyansk he became ill on the journey there and instead was sent to Olyokminsk. On 28 November 1886 Ovchinnikov arrived at the remote settlement. He made repeated requests for permission to participate in the few regional imperial institutions but they were denied by Governor-General Alexey Ignatiev.

Forced to serve his sentencing bereft of outside contact Ovchinnikov and began studying the inhabitants of Olyokminsk. Russian settlers sometimes hired Sakha to teach the Sakha language and taiga survival skills. According to Ovchinnikov the Russian Orthodox Church was the only Russian cultural influence in the remote north. During his sentencing Bishop Jacob (Domsky) visited the settlement. Some Sakha residents of Olyokminsk practiced syncretic mixture of their traditional shamanist beliefs and Orthodox Christianity. On 11 January 1889 Mikhail married Alexandra Gabysheva who was a member of the Olyok ulus.

Irkutsk
In January 1891 Ovchinnikov finished his five year sentence to the Russian Arctic. He was issued an internal passport on 21 June and departed for Irkutsk with his family on 17 November. In 1892 he regained the ability to travel to European Russia with the exception of the Moscow and Saint Petersburg Governorates. In 1898 he was restored his rescinded political rights.

Ovchinnikov developed his skills as a self-taught archaeologist, and became an active part of the Eastern Siberian Branch of the Imperial Russian Geographical Society (ESBIRGS). Headquartered in Irkutsk the organization included academics like Nikolai N. Agapitov, Jan Czerski, Dmitry Klements, Vladimir Obruchev, Grigory Potanin, and Nikolai Ivanovich Vitkovsky. In 1900 Ovchinnikov was elected a full time member and eight years later became the conservator of the museum maintained in Irkutsk. Due to interpersonal conflicts he resigned two years later, an experience that Ovchinnikov considered particularly painful.

The Irkutsk Scientific Archive Commission was formed in 1911. Ovchinnikov initially served as a deputy before becoming the chairman. In 1912 the first of several annual exhibits documenting the ancient history of Baikalia were held. Ovchinnikov served as the chairman for the exhibit held in 1912. The first volume of the organization's proceedings were published in 1913 with Ovchinnikov acting as an assistant to the editor.

In 1917 Ovchinnikov became the head of the Irkutsk Provincial Archive upon its formation. During that year the Russian Civil War erupted which him to suffer financial difficulties and malnutrition. Regardless of the privations he continued work for the Provincial Archive. Ovchinnikov was admitted to the Irkutsk State University hospital and died there on 11 June 1921. Among the items bequeathed by Ovchinnikov to the Irkutsk Scientific Archive were numerous notes and drafts about Eastern Siberian archeology and ethnography, along with correspondence with various scientific figures and journalists.

Archeology

Sakha progenitors
Ovchinnikov interviewed local Sakha people about their social customs and religious beliefs while exiled at Olyokminsk. In 1897 he published a collection of their traditional folklore. One account claims that the Sakha once inhabited Baikalia but certain enemies forced them north to the Lena River. During the 1890s Ovchinnikov conducted interviews with local Irkutsk Buryats. They told stories of their ancestors displacing a group of blacksmiths from Lake Baikal. These accounts identified the Uryankhay, a term usually applied to the Tuvans, with the Sakha. D. A. Kochnev later agreed with this connection based on his own interpretation of linguistic data.

Ovchinnikov hypothesized that the ancestral Sakha were hypothesized to originate from the Baraba steppe. They gradually migrated east to the Yenisey and later Baikalia. During the time of Chinggis Khan the ancient Sakha were forced to the Lena by the expanding Mongol Empire. He found evidence of iron and copper smithing along with caches of iron ore deposited in pits in the region. Near Bratsk and Kirensk he collected arrowheads that in his opinion resembled Sakha made ones. Outside Irkutsk he found a buried piece of shale with an image of a woman carved onto it. Ovchinnikov considered the finding proof that Turkic peoples resided on the Angara. 

At the Irkutsk Museum in 1912 Ovchinnikov met Bernhard Petri and developed a close relationship with him. Petri reported that the ethnogenesis of the Sakha was "jokingly dubbed" the "Yakut problem" in their discussions. The Kurumchi culture was influenced by the earlier work of Ovchinnikov. For example the ancient Sakha as conceived by Ovchinnikov inhabited the same territories as the Kurumchi as proposed by Petri. It has also been demonstrated that Ovchinnikov's opinions served as the basis to Petri's 1922 article "Ancient Buryatia."

Glazkovsky Necropolis
During building construction outside Irkutsk in Glazkov (within the contemporary Sverdlovsk district) a series of ancient burials were uncovered. The old graves weren't preserved and became damaged by laborers. In 1887 Nikolai Vitkovsky documented the destroyed graves. In 1892 Ovchinnikov discovered more ancient burials in the Maiden Tsar park (now the Paris Commune Park) in what has become known as the 
Glazkovsky Necropolis. He made further surveys of the park in 1897. Throughout these digs a number of old copper knives were found, with several adorned with bone handles. Ovchinnikov believed the blades to have been produced locally in Baikalia. In 1906 Ovchinnikov proposed the Paleolithic era Kitoi and the Neolithic era Irkutsk archeological cultures. Vitkovsky renamed the Neolithic society to the Glazkov culture which became the accepted appellation by scholars. The Irkutsk section of the Trans-Siberian Railway began in 1897. The creation of infrastructure including depots, stations, secondary roads destroyed several hundred ancient burials of the Glazkovsky Necropolis.

Legacy
Contemporaries of Ovchinnikov called him "the Father of Siberian Archeology" due his many years of raising interest in the ancient history of Eastern Siberia. Although generally unwilling to publish his conclusions, his conviction that bronze capable societies once existed in the region was seen as an especially important intellectual development. Ovchinnikov located many archeological sites around Irkutsk that were later reexamined in a methodical manner by Irkutsk State University staff and students. During the 1920s the vast majority of the Irkutsk Museum ancient collections were still items discovered by Ovchinnikov.

Bernhard Petri recalled the personal study of Ovchinnikov being quite cramped: 

In 2003 Bair Dashibalov re-examined the published works of Ovchinnikov and found that he "was carried away by the proof of the Yakut presence in the Baikal region." M. Chirikova in 2012 noted that Ovchinnikov "devoted his life to the development of historical science" in Eastern Siberia. In 2016 Vladimir Ushnitsky concluded that Ovchinnikov expanded the archeological knowledge of Eastern Siberia but found his work on Sakha folklore particularly valuable for ethnographer researchers.

Bibliography

Published works

Books

Articles

References

1844 births
1921 deaths
Politicians from Arkhangelsk
Russian archaeologists
Russian ethnographers
Soviet ethnographers
Soviet archaeologists
Soviet historians
20th-century archaeologists